Pentrefelin, Ceredigion is a hamlet in the  community of Llanfair Clydogau, Ceredigion, Wales, which is 57.3 miles (92.3 km) from Cardiff and 171.9 miles (276.7 km) from London. Pentrefelin is represented in the Senedd by Elin Jones (Plaid Cymru) and is part of the Ceredigion constituency in the House of Commons.

References

See also
List of localities in Wales by population 

Villages in Ceredigion